The Randolph Tabernacle is a Victorian-styled meetinghouse for the Randolph Ward (congregation) of the Church of Jesus Christ of Latter-day Saints (LDS Church) and is located in Randolph, Rich County, Utah. It was listed on the National Register of Historic Places on April 10, 1986.

Construction
On July 5, 1898, after the creation of the Woodruff Stake, it was decided to build a large meetinghouse for the Randolph Ward that could accommodate people from small outlying communities. Given that the meetinghouse was to be built and used primarily by the Randolph Ward (one congregation) and not multiple congregations within the Woodruff Stake, it is technically not a tabernacle, but a meetinghouse, though its size and elaborate architectural style may be why it has been known colloquially as the Randolph Tabernacle.  Members of the Randolph Ward provided almost all of the cost of the building, which by some estimates was around $24,000.  The brick walls were complete by 1901 and the roof was finished in 1902.  In November 1904, the building was in usable condition and the first meeting was held.  The two-story  tower was completed in 1909.  The building was dedicated on July 26, 1914, by then-LDS Apostle George Albert Smith.  The architect, John C. Gray, also served as the bishop of Randolph Ward from 1901-1921.

Modifications
Minor renovations occurred in 1936 and 1977. An extensive renovation took place between 1984-1985, which included a large rear addition for classrooms, a cultural hall, and offices. The meetinghouse remains in use by the Randolph Ward.

Notes

External links

20th-century Latter Day Saint church buildings
Buildings and structures in Rich County, Utah
Meetinghouses of the Church of Jesus Christ of Latter-day Saints in Utah
Churches on the National Register of Historic Places in Utah
Churches completed in 1914
Tabernacles (LDS Church) in Utah
Victorian architecture in Utah
National Register of Historic Places in Rich County, Utah
1914 establishments in Utah